Charles Edward Fuller (March 10, 1847 – April 28, 1925) was an American farmer and politician from New York.

Life 
Fuller was born on March 10, 1847, in Binghamton, New York, the son of Joseph Fuller and Matilda Luce. He was a descendent of Samuel Fuller, the surgeon of the Mayflower.

Fuller attended common schools, spent three years with a private tutor, and graduated from Lowell's Business College. He taught school for around ten years, briefly worked as a bookkeeper, and by 1897 was a farmer. He was also a trustee, secretary, and treasurer of Conklin Milk and Produce Company. A resident of Conklin, he was an assessor of the town. He also represented the town as town supervisor for ten years, serving as chairman of the board of supervisors in 1890. In 1880, he was appointed school commissioner of the First District to fill a vacancy caused by the resignation of Arthur G. Wilson. He was elected for a three-year term for that office later that year.

In 1896, Fuller was elected to the New York State Assembly as a Republican, representing the Broome County 1st District. He served in the Assembly in 1897 and 1898. While in the Assembly, he helped pass the biannual townmeeting bill in 1897, and in 1898 he helped pass the Fuller good road bill (which provided state aid to improve highways or towns that adopt the money system.

Fuller was a ruling elder of the Presbyterian Church of Conklin. He was also a member of the Freemasons and a trustee and secretary of the Conklin Cemetery Association. In 1870, he married Annie M. Banta. Their children were Grace M. and Alice Fennett. They had a son Archie E. who died in 1889 when he was seventeen.

Fuller died at home on April 28, 1925. He was buried in Conklin Cemetery.

References

External links 
 The Political Graveyard

1847 births
1925 deaths
Politicians from Binghamton, New York
Farmers from New York (state)
Town supervisors in New York (state)
19th-century American politicians
Republican Party members of the New York State Assembly
Presbyterians from New York (state)
American Freemasons
Burials in New York (state)